Sasa Bratić (born August 29, 1981) is a Serbian former professional basketball player. He is a 2.03 m (6 ft 8in) tall power forward.

External links
 Sasa Bratić at kk.radnicki.rs
 Sasa Bratić at fiba.com

1981 births
Living people
ABA League players
AEK Larnaca B.C. players
Basketball League of Serbia players
BC Khimik players
Hapoel Galil Elyon players
Hapoel Holon players
KK Beovuk 72 players
KK Crvena zvezda players
KK Lavovi 063 players
KK FMP (1991–2011) players
KK Radnički Kragujevac (2009–2014) players
Maccabi Haifa B.C. players
Sportspeople from Jagodina
Power forwards (basketball)
BKK Radnički players
Serbian expatriate basketball people in Cyprus
Serbian expatriate basketball people in Israel
Serbian expatriate basketball people in Romania
Serbian expatriate basketball people in North Macedonia
Serbian expatriate basketball people in Ukraine
Serbian men's basketball players